The Ministry of Environment and Energy (MINAE) is a ministry or department of the government of Costa Rica.

Agencies
SINAC  - National System of Conservation Areas 
DGGM  - Geology and Mining General Directorate 
SETENA  - National Technical Environmental Secretariat
TAA  - Environmental Administrative Tribunal
OCIC  - Costa Rican Office on Joint Implementation
FONAFIFO  - National Forest Fund
DGH  - General Directorate for Hydrocarbons
IMN  - National Meteorological Institute 
CONAGEBIO  - National Commission for Biodiversity Management
PMP  - Marine Park of the Pacific

References

External links
  

Costa Rica, Environment, Energy and Telecommunications
Institutions of Costa Rica
Nature conservation in Costa Rica